MLU may stand for:

 Major League Ultimate, a defunct ultimate frisbee league
 Martin Luther University, in Halle and Wittenberg, Saxony-Anhalt, Germany
 Mean length of utterance
 Mid-life update
 Mirror lock-up, in SLR cameras
 Monroe Regional Airport (Louisiana), US, IATA code
 Mountain Locator Unit, emergency beacon
 To’abaita language, ISO 639-3 language code
 the SCMaglev, formerly MLU, maglev railway